The molecular formula C6H11NO3 (molar mass: 145.16 g/mol, exact mass: 145.0739 u) may refer to:

 Allysine
 Methyl aminolevulinate (MAL)

Molecular formulas